Tatís is a Spanish surname.  Notable people with the surname include:

Fernando Tatís (born 1975), Dominican baseball manager and former player
Fernando Tatís Jr. (born 1999), Dominican baseball player
Ramón Tatís (born 1973), Dominican baseball pitcher

See also
Tatış, surname

Spanish-language surnames